State Highway 83A is a four-lane state highway in Tamil Nadu connecting Erode with Dharapuram. It runs in Erode district and Tirupur District of Tamil Nadu, India.

Route 
The highway passes through Avalpoondurai, Arachalur, Kangeyam, Uthiyur to a length of 78 km.

Major junctions 

 NH 381A at Moolapalayam, Erode
 Erode Ring Road near Anaikkalpalayam
 State Highway 172 at Kangeyam
 National Highway NH-81 at Kangeyam
 State Highway 37 at Dharapuram
 State Highway 21 at Dharapuram
 State Highway 97 at Dharapuram
 State Highway 83 SH 83 at Dharapuram

References

State highways in Tamil Nadu
Transport in Erode